The Hokkaido Open is a golf tournament which was on the Japan Golf Tour from 1977 to 1991. It was first played in 1967. It is played in September at a variety of courses in Hokkaidō.

Winners
this list is incomplete

2021 Fumihiro Ebine
2020 
2019 Ryuichi Kondo
2018 Shunsuke Otani
2017 Masashi Okajima
2016 Shunsuke Otani
2015 Naruhito Ueda
2014 Hideki Kase
2013 Terumichi Kakazu
2012 Takeshi Sakiyama
2011 Eiji Mizoguchi
2010 Naruhito Ueda
2009 Katsunori Kuwabara
2008 Yuudai Maeda
2007 Tatsunari Nukata
2006 Kiyotaka Inoue
2005 Achi Sato
2004 Nobuhiro Masuda
2003 Nobuhiro Masuda
2002 Hisayuki Sasaki
2001 Hiromichi Kubo
2000 Koichi Uehara
1999 Naoya Okawa
1998 Shigehisa Goo
1997 Fumio Tanaka
1996
1995 Miyuki Omori
1994 Ken Oyama
1993 Koichi Uehara
1992 Kazuhiko Takami
1991 Katsunari Takahashi
1990 Katsunari Takahashi
1989 Mamoru Takahashi
1988 Mamoru Takahashi
1987 Akihiko Kojima
1986 Katsunari Takahashi
1985 Katsunari Takahashi
1984 Koichi Uehara
1983 Katsunari Takahashi
1982 Koichi Uehara
1981 Mitsuyoshi Goto
1980 Koichi Uehara
1979 Shoichi Sato
1978 Koichi Uehara
1977 Koichi Uehara
1976 Koichi Uehara
1975 
1974 Kenji Takeda
1973 
1972 Kenji Takeda
1971 
1970 
1969 Kenji Takeda
1968 Shimizu Kubota
1967

External links
Coverage on Japan Golf Tour's official site

Former Japan Golf Tour events
Golf tournaments in Japan
Sport in Hokkaido
Recurring sporting events established in 1967